Albert Finch (16 May 1926 – 23 January 2003) was a British boxer from Croydon in South London, who was active from 1945 to 1958. He fought as both a middleweight and light-heavyweight, becoming British middleweight champion in 1950.

He was one of seven children and learnt to box at the age of eight. He had a successful amateur career, winning 63 out of 68 contests.

Professional career
He had his first professional fight on 14 August 1945 at the Queensbury Club, Soho, London. He fought a draw over six rounds against Eddie Starrs.

He continued to build up a successful domestic record with the odd defeat. In October 1948 he beat Mark Hart for the Southern Area middleweight title, winning on points over 12 rounds.

In April 1948, he fought the promising young middleweight, Randolph Turpin, at the Royal Albert Hall, and inflicted Turpin's first defeat, winning on points over eight rounds.

In June 1949, he challenged Dick Turpin, elder brother of Randolph, for his British and Commonwealth middleweight titles. The fight was held in Birmingham and Turpin won on points over fifteen rounds.

In April 1950, he had a re-match with Dick Turpin, who in the meantime had lost his Commonwealth title. The fight was held in Nottingham and Finch won on points over fifteen rounds after having been knocked down twice. He was now the British middleweight champion.

Finch held the British title for only six months before losing it to Dick Turpin's brother, Randolph in October 1950. They met at Harringay Arena, and Turpin, who had a powerful punch, knocked Finch out in the fifth round.

Finch began to find it difficult to make the middleweight weight limit and so moved up to fight as a light-heavyweight. Following the Turpin defeat, he had a run of seven straight victories against light-heavyweights before fighting Don Cockell for his British and European light-heavyweight titles. The fight was in October 1951, at the Harringay Arena, and Cockell won by a knockout in the seventh round.

He continued fighting as a light-heavyweight and in November 1954 he had another attempt at the British light-heavyweight title when he fought the holder, Alex Buxton, in Birmingham. Unfortunately, he suffered another knockout, this time in the eighth round. By fighting at the heavier weight he was meeting heavier punches and so suffered more knockouts than previously.

In March 1956, he had a third attempt at the British light-heavyweight title when he fought Ron Barton for the vacant title. The fight at Harringay Arena ended with Barton winning by a technical knockout in the eighth round. This was his last title fight.

He continued fighting, with mixed success. One notable victory was a win by disqualification against Jim Cooper, Henry Cooper's twin brother, in Stockholm. He had his last fight in March 1958, losing by a knockout in the third round against Noel Trigg.

Retirement
After his retirement he worked at a meat market in Croydon and was active in assisting youthful boxers. He died in 2003 at the age of 76 years.

Professional boxing record

|-
|align="centr" colspan=8|72 Wins (21 knockouts, 50 decisions, 1 DQ), 21 Losses (9 knockouts, 11 decisions, 1 DQ), 9 Draws, 1 No Contest
|-
| align="centr" style="border-style: none none solid solid; background: #e3e3e3"|Result
| align="centr" style="border-style: none none solid solid; background: #e3e3e3"|Record
| align="centr" style="border-style: none none solid solid; background: #e3e3e3"|Opponent
| align="centr" style="border-style: none none solid solid; background: #e3e3e3"|Type
| align="centr" style="border-style: none none solid solid; background: #e3e3e3"|Round
| align="centr" style="border-style: none none solid solid; background: #e3e3e3"|Date
| align="centr" style="border-style: none none solid solid; background: #e3e3e3"|Location
| align="centr" style="border-style: none none solid solid; background: #e3e3e3"|Notes
|-align=center
|Loss
|
|align=left| Noel Trigg
|KO
|3
|17 March 1958
|align=left| Cheltenham Town Hall, Cheltenham, Gloucestershire
|align=left|
|-
|Draw
|
|align=left| Ron Redrup
|PTS
|8
|3 February 1958
|align=left| Leyton Baths, Leyton, England
|align=left|
|-
|Draw
|
|align=left| Jack Whittaker
|PTS
|8
|13 January 1958
|align=left| Cheltenham Town Hall, Cheltenham, Gloucestershire
|align=left|
|-
|Win
|
|align=left| Tony Dove
|PTS
|10
|3 October 1957
|align=left| Corn Hall, Norwich, Norfolk
|align=left|
|-
|Loss
|
|align=left| Willie Armstrong
|PTS
|8
|21 August 1957
|align=left| Ice Rink, Paisley
|align=left|
|-
|Loss
|
|align=left| Manuel Burgo
|KO
|2
|29 July 1957
|align=left| Engineer's Club, West Hartlepool, County Durham
|align=left|
|-
|Win
|
|align=left| Jim Cooper
|DQ
|7
|19 May 1957
|align=left| Johanneshovs Isstadion, Stockholm
|align=left|
|-
|Win
|
|align=left| Terrence Murphy
|PTS
|12
|26 March 1957
|align=left| Streatham Ice Arena, Streatham, England
|align=left|
|-
|Loss
|
|align=left| Erich Schoppner
|PTS
|8
|3 February 1957
|align=left| Westfalenhallen, Dortmund, North Rhine-Westphalia
|align=left|
|-
|Win
|
|align=left| Serge Leveque
|PTS
|8
|28 December 1956
|align=left| Masshallen, Gothenburg
|align=left|
|-
|Win
|
|align=left| Andre Cottyn
|TKO
|10
|8 September 1956
|align=left| Ostend, West Flanders
|align=left|
|-
|Loss
|
|align=left| Ron Barton
|TKO
|8
|13 March 1956
|align=left| Harringay Arena, Harringay, London
|align=left|
|-
|Draw
|
|align=left| Uwe Janssen
|PTS
|8
|22 January 1956
|align=left| Westfalenhallen, Dortmund, North Rhine-Westphalia
|align=left|
|-
|Win
|
|align=left| Charles Colin
|PTS
|10
|30 October 1955
|align=left| St. Nazaire Stadium, Saint-Nazaire, Loire-Atlantique
|align=left|
|-
|Draw
|
|align=left| Fred Powell
|PTS
|8
|4 October 1955
|align=left| Streatham Ice Arena, Streatham, England
|align=left|
|-
|Loss
|
|align=left| Alex Buxton
|KO
|8
|9 November 1954
|align=left| Embassy Sportsdrome, Birmingham, West Midlands
|align=left|
|-
|Win
|
|align=left| Marcel Limage
|TKO
|9
|18 May 1954
|align=left| Royal Albert Hall, Kensington, London
|align=left|
|-
|Win
|
|align=left| Arthur Howard
|TKO
|8
|23 March 1954
|align=left| Earls Court Arena, Kensington, London
|align=left|
|-
|Win
|
|align=left| Joe Bygraves
|PTS
|8
|23 February 1954
|align=left| Royal Albert Hall, Kensington, London
|align=left|
|-
|Win
|
|align=left| Billy Dean
|TKO
|5
|3 November 1953
|align=left| Harringay Arena, Harringay, London
|align=left|
|-
|Win
|
|align=left| Dave Williams
|TKO
|7
|20 October 1953
|align=left| Streatham Ice Arena, Streatham, England
|align=left|
|-
|Draw
|
|align=left| Arthur Howard
|PTS
|8
|13 October 1953
|align=left| Earls Court Arena, Kensington, London
|align=left|
|-
|Win
|
|align=left| Jimmy Davis
|PTS
|8
|6 October 1953
|align=left| Royal Albert Hall, Kensington, London
|align=left|
|-
|Loss
|
|align=left| Dennis Powell
|PTS
|10
|8 September 1953
|align=left| Park Hall, Oswestry, Shropshire
|align=left|
|-
|Loss
|
|align=left| Wim Snoek
|PTS
|10
|18 May 1953
|align=left| Empress Hall, Earl's Court, Kensington, London
|align=left|
|-
|Win
|
|align=left| Charles Colin
|PTS
|10
|25 April 1953
|align=left| St. Nazaire Stadium, Saint-Nazaire, Loire-Atlantique
|align=left|
|-
|Loss
|
|align=left| Gerhard Hecht
|TKO
|9
|20 March 1953
|align=left| Funkturm Berlin, Westend, Berlin
|align=left|
|-
|Win
|
|align=left| Johnny Barton
|PTS
|8
|16 February 1953
|align=left| Leyton Baths, Leyton, England
|align=left|
|-
|Loss
|
|align=left| George Walker
|DQ
|5
|2 December 1952
|align=left| Empress Hall, Earl's Court, Kensington, London
|align=left|
|-
|Loss
|
|align=left| George Walker
|KO
|6
|28 October 1952
|align=left| Empress Hall, Earl's Court, Kensington, London
|align=left|
|-
|Win
|
|align=left| Brian Anders
|PTS
|8
|14 October 1952
|align=left| Streatham Ice Arena, Streatham, England
|align=left|
|-
|Win
|
|align=left| Garnett Denny
|PTS
|10
|23 February 1952
|align=left| Ulster Hall, Belfast
|align=left|
|-
|Win
|
|align=left| Michel Lapourielle
|TKO
|8
|13 February 1952
|align=left| Brighton Dome, Brighton, Sussex
|align=left|
|-
|Win
|
|align=left| Gene "KO" Fowler
|TKO
|5
|21 January 1952
|align=left| Leyton Baths, Leyton, England
|align=left|
|-
|Loss
|
|align=left| Don Cockell
|KO
|7
|16 October 1951
|align=left| Harringay Arena, Harringay, London
|align=left|
|-
|Win
|
|align=left| Billy Wood
|TKO
|5
|29 May 1951
|align=left| Selhurst Park, Crystal Palace, London
|align=left|
|-
|Win
|
|align=left| Dave Williams
|TKO
|5
|16 May 1951
|align=left| Maindy Stadium, Cardiff
|align=left|
|-
|Win
|
|align=left| Paddy Slavin
|PTS
|10
|30 April 1951
|align=left| Empress Hall, Earl's Court, Kensington, London
|align=left|
|-
|Win
|
|align=left| Johnny McGowan
|TKO
|9
|19 March 1951
|align=left| Granby Halls, Leicester, Leicestershire
|align=left|
|-
|Win
|
|align=left| Don Mogard
|PTS
|8
|26 February 1951
|align=left| Leyton Baths, Leyton, England
|align=left|
|-
|Win
|
|align=left| Jackie Harris
|PTS
|8
|12 February 1951
|align=left| Leyton Baths, Leyton, England
|align=left|
|-
|Win
|
|align=left| Reg Spring
|PTS
|8
|22 January 1951
|align=left| Leyton Baths, Leyton, England
|align=left|
|-
|Loss
|
|align=left| Randy Turpin
|KO
|5
|17 October 1950
|align=left| Harringay Arena, Harringay, London
|align=left|
|-
|Win
|
|align=left| Albert Heyen
|PTS
|10
|27 September 1950
|align=left| Ynysangharad Park, Pontypridd
|align=left|
|-
|Draw
|
|align=left| Cyrille Delannoit
|PTS
|10
|21 July 1950
|align=left| Ostend, West Flanders
|align=left|
|-
|Win
|
|align=left| Dick Turpin
|TKO
|8
|3 July 1950
|align=left| Nottingham Ice Stadium, Nottingham, Nottinghamshire
|align=left|
|-
|Win
|
|align=left| Eli Elandon
|PTS
|10
|26 June 1950
|align=left| Town Hall, Northampton, Northamptonshire
|align=left|
|-
|Win
|
|align=left| Juan Torrecillas
|TKO
|3
|12 June 1950
|align=left| Selhurst Park, Crystal Palace, London
|align=left|
|-
|Win
|
|align=left| Dick Turpin
|PTS
|15
|24 April 1950
|align=left| Nottingham Ice Stadium, Nottingham, Nottinghamshire
|align=left|
|-
|Win
|
|align=left| Joe Beckett
|PTS
|10
|29 March 1950
|align=left| Norwich, Norfolk
|align=left|
|-
|Draw
|
|align=left| Mel Brown
|PTS
|10
|13 March 1950
|align=left| Streatham Ice Arena, Streatham, England
|align=left|
|-
|Draw
|
|align=left| Allan Cooke
|PTS
|8
|21 February 1950
|align=left| West Ham Baths, West Ham, England
|align=left|
|-
|Loss
|
|align=left| Baby Day
|PTS
|10
|7 February 1950
|align=left| Empress Hall, Earl's Court, Kensington, London
|align=left|
|-
|Win
|
|align=left| Jimmy Ingle
|KO
|4
|5 December 1949
|align=left| Leeds Town Hall, Leeds, Yorkshire
|align=left|
|-
|Win
|
|align=left| Albert Heyen
|PTS
|10
|14 November 1949
|align=left| Davis Theatre, Croydon, London
|align=left|
|-
|Loss
|
|align=left| Bert Hyland
|PTS
|8
|24 October 1949
|align=left| Leyton Baths, Leyton, England
|align=left|
|-
|Win
|
|align=left| George Ross
|PTS
|10
|4 October 1949
|align=left| Empress Hall, Earl's Court, Kensington, London
|align=left|
|-
|Win
|
|align=left| Bert Sanders
|PTS
|8
|18 August 1949
|align=left| Stadium, Dartford, Kent
|align=left|
|-
|Loss
|
|align=left| Dick Turpin
|PTS
|15
|20 June 1949
|align=left| St Andrew's, Birmingham, West Midlands
|align=left|
|-
|Win
|
|align=left| Bob Cleaver
|KO
|7
|24 May 1949
|align=left| Selhurst Park, Crystal Palace, London
|align=left|
|-
|Win
|
|align=left| Bert Hyland
|PTS
|8
|21 April 1949
|align=left| Manor Place Baths, Walworth, London
|align=left|
|-
|Win
|
|align=left| Des Jones
|PTS
|8
|10 March 1949
|align=left| Caledonian Road Baths, Islington, London
|align=left|
|-
|Loss
|
|align=left| Luc van Dam
|PTS
|10
|24 January 1949
|align=left| Royal Albert Hall, Kensington, London
|align=left|
|-
|Win
|
|align=left| Doug Myers
|TKO
|6
|13 December 1948
|align=left| Manor Place Baths, Walworth, London
|align=left|
|-
|Win
|
|align=left| Mark Hart
|PTS
|12
|11 October 1948
|align=left| Acacia Hall, Croydon, London
|align=left|
|-
|Win
|
|align=left| Bert Sanders
|PTS
|10
|10 August 1948
|align=left| Selhurst Park, Crystal Palace, London
|align=left|
|-
|Win
|
|align=left| George Dilkes
|PTS
|8
|11 June 1948
|align=left| Belle Vue Zoological Gardens, Belle Vue, Manchester
|align=left|
|-
|Win
|
|align=left| Frederick Jock Taylor
|TKO
|7
|8 June 1948
|align=left| Selhurst Park, Crystal Palace, London
|align=left|
|-
|Win
|
|align=left| Randy Turpin
|PTS
|8
|26 April 1948
|align=left| Royal Albert Hall, Kensington, London
|align=left|
|-
|Win
|
|align=left| Pat Mulcahy
|TKO
|6
|15 December 1947
|align=left| Leyton Baths, Leyton, England
|align=left|
|-
|Win
|
|align=left| Geoff Heath
|PTS
|8
|10 December 1947
|align=left| Acacia Hall, Croydon, London
|align=left|
|-
|Win
|
|align=left| Al Marson
|PTS
|8
|28 November 1947
|align=left| Plumstead Baths, Plumstead, England
|align=left|
|-
|No Contest
|
|align=left| Jack Johnson
|NC
|4
|1 July 1947
|align=left| London Olympia, Kensington, London
|align=left|
|-
|Win
|
|align=left| Freddie Price
|PTS
|8
|28 April 1947
|align=left| Green Pond Road, Walthamstow, England
|align=left|
|-
|Loss
|
|align=left| Mark Hart
|PTS
|12
|16 April 1947
|align=left| Manor Place Baths, Walworth, London
|align=left|
|-
|Win
|
|align=left| Jimmy Ingle
|PTS
|8
|11 March 1947
|align=left| Seymour Hall, Marylebone, England
|align=left|
|-
|Win
|
|align=left| Bert Hyland
|TKO
|6
|11 February 1947
|align=left| Regents Crest Hotel, Marylebone, England
|align=left|
|-
|Win
|
|align=left| Arthur Sadd
|PTS
|8
|21 January 1947
|align=left| Seymour Hall, Marylebone, England
|align=left|
|-
|Win
|
|align=left| Tommy Braddock
|PTS
|8
|17 December 1946
|align=left| Beckenham Baths, Beckenham, England
|align=left|
|-
|Win
|
|align=left| Paddy Roche
|PTS
|8
|3 December 1946
|align=left| Margate, Kent
|align=left|
|-
|Win
|
|align=left| Frank Hayes
|PTS
|8
|28 November 1946
|align=left| Ramsgate, Kent
|align=left|
|-
|Win
|
|align=left| Alby Hollister
|PTS
|8
|19 November 1946
|align=left| Seymour Hall Baths, Marylebone, England
|align=left|
|-
|Loss
|
|align=left| Mark Hart
|PTS
|12
|23 October 1946
|align=left| Grand Theatre, Clapham, London
|align=left|
|-
|Win
|
|align=left| Paddy Roche
|TKO
|8
|14 October 1946
|align=left| Beckenham Baths, Beckenham, England
|align=left|
|-
|Win
|
|align=left| Harry Groves
|PTS
|10
|9 October 1946
|align=left| Grand Theatre, Clapham, London
|align=left|
|-
|Loss
|
|align=left| Vince Hawkins
|PTS
|8
|17 September 1946
|align=left| Harringay Arena, Harringay, London, England
|align=left|
|-
|Win
|
|align=left| Jim Hockley
|PTS
|8
|9 July 1946
|align=left| Town Hall, Willesden, England
|align=left|
|-
|Win
|
|align=left| Jimmy Stewart
|PTS
|8
|25 June 1946
|align=left| Brighton Dome, Brighton, Sussex
|align=left|
|-
|Win
|
|align=left| Johnny Blake
|PTS
|8
|31 May 1946
|align=left| Agricultural Hall, Maidstone, Kent
|align=left|
|-
|Loss
|
|align=left| Harry Watson
|TKO
|5
|25 March 1946
|align=left| Greenwich Baths, Greenwich, London
|align=left|
|-
|Win
|
|align=left| Frank Hayes
|PTS
|8
|19 March 1946
|align=left| Beckenham Baths, Beckenham, England
|align=left|
|-
|Win
|
|align=left| Billy Cottrell
|PTS
|8
|25 January 1946
|align=left| Manor Place Baths, Walworth, London
|align=left|
|-
|Win
|
|align=left| Paddy Roche
|PTS
|8
|24 January 1946
|align=left| Assembly Rooms, Royal Tunbridge Wells, Kent
|align=left|
|-
|Win
|
|align=left| Billy Cottrell
|TKO
|5
|16 January 1946
|align=left| Beckenham Baths, Beckenham, England
|align=left|
|-
|Win
|
|align=left| Jim Hockley
|PTS
|8
|7 January 1946
|align=left| Caledonian Road Baths, Islington, London
|align=left|
|-
|Win
|
|align=left| Jim Laverick
|PTS
|8
|18 December 1945
|align=left| Queensbury Club, Soho, London
|align=left|
|-
|Win
|
|align=left| Jack Lewis
|PTS
|6
|3 December 1945
|align=left| Plumstead Baths, Plumstead, England
|align=left|
|-
|Win
|
|align=left| Jack Lewis
|PTS
|8
|13 November 1945
|align=left| Caledonian Road Baths, Islington, London
|align=left|
|-
|Win
|
|align=left| Cyril Johnson
|KO
|2
|6 November 1945
|align=left| Queensbury Club, Soho, London
|align=left|
|-
|Win
|
|align=left| Jim Hockley
|PTS
|6
|20 October 1945
|align=left| Kingston Baths, Kingston, London
|align=left|
|-
|Win
|
|align=left| Ted Baxter
|PTS
|6
|9 October 1945
|align=left| Caledonian Road Baths, Islington, London
|align=left|
|-
|Win
|
|align=left| Gordon Griffiths
|PTS
|6
|11 September 1945
|align=left| Queensbury Club, Soho, London
|align=left|
|-
|Draw
|
|align=left| Eddie Starrs
|PTS
|6
|14 August 1945
|align=left| Queensbury Club, Soho, London
|align=left|
|}

See also
 List of British middleweight boxing champions

References

External links
 

1926 births
2003 deaths
People from Croydon
English male boxers
Boxers from Greater London
Light-heavyweight boxers